Public radio broadcasting began in Singapore in April 1925, after the Amateur Wireless Society of Malaya obtained a temporary license to broadcast. Radio Singapura was established as the first local mass market radio service in 1959. Subsequently, on 15 February 1963, before the withdrawal of the British Armed Forces, and after the merger with Malaya, Singapore's first television service began as Televisyen Singapura (TV Singapura) under its owner, Radio Television Singapore (RTS).

History

Initial broadcasts
From 1922, a series of government committees were constituted to look into the licensing requirement for receiving, transmitting, and broadcasting radio signals throughout the British Empire. In 1924, only 17 licenses were issued in Singapore, mostly for experiments to ascertain the equipment necessary for wireless transmissions, while the issuance of licenses to amateurs remained suspended. Public radio broadcast in Singapore began in April 1925, after the Amateur Wireless Society of Malaya (AWSM) obtained a temporary license to broadcast. Operating as the callsign, 1SE (One Singapore Experimental), the station used a 100-watt transmitter lent by the Marconi Company to transmit its signals from the top floor of Union Building, Collyer Quay. Its first concert transmission was broadcast in April 1925. AWSM would continue to broadcast regular transmissions of vocal and instrumental items by local artists on Friday and Saturday nights, as well as experimental broadcast on Sunday mornings. The transmissions could be received from as far as Penang, albeit with atmospheric interferences at times.

Radio Singapura
Radio Singapura, the first local radio service, was launched on 4 January 1959 months before Singapore gained gradual autonomy from the United Kingdom.

Radio Singapura subsequently became part of Radio Television Singapore (RTS), which in turn became part of the Singapore Broadcasting Corporation (SBC). After SBC was fully privatised, it became the Radio Corporation of Singapore (RCS) which would later become the radio broadcasting division of Mediacorp.

Rediffusion Singapore

With the success of Radio Singapura, another key player in the broadcasting industry in the pre-independence Singapore, Rediffusion Singapore, introduced cable broadcasting service to Singapore in 1949. Rediffusion Singapore brought radio to housing areas which lacked decent radio reception with quality radio broadcast.

Radio Rediffusion, the pioneer cable-radio operator on Clemenceau Avenue, continued to operate in the modern era of radio broadcasting in Singapore, however, it was not entirely able to withstand the forces of technology and time. Radio Rediffusion operated successfully for many years on a subscription-based model, and while the service did make the digital transition (even pioneering the use of encrypted DAB+), it was becoming evident that more changes were needed to keep the operation alive. The changes that were made proved to be not enough and this led to a down-shifting, eventually closing down, and having its name and assets sold off in 2012.

NTUC Heart (1991-2001)

So Drama! Entertainment

So Drama! Entertainment is managed by the SAFRA National Service Association, a non-profit organisation that is dedicated to the welfare of National Servicemen (colloquially called "NSmen"). So Drama! Entertainment runs two stations, Power 98 Love Songs and 88.3Jia, broadcasting in English and Mandarin Chinese respectively. The stations cater to national and professional servicemen, and both radio stations are entertainment-based, featuring modern commercial music and the latest entertainment news.

SPH Radio
SPH Radio operates 5 radio stations, which includes 96.3 Hao FM and UFM100.3 in Mandarin, as well as Money FM 89.3, Kiss92 and HOT FM91.3 in English.

HOT FM91.3 is an English Contemporary Hit Radio (CHR) music station playing new and current top 40 hits catering to listeners under 30. Programs and promotions are injected with loads of fun and quirkiness with a key focus on engagement and the listener's experience. Hot FM91.3 has become well known for identifying and playing hits before they are hits. Listeners are given control over the playlist through Hot FM91.3's online feedback platform called "Rate The Hits" which allows listeners to directly influence which songs they want to hear and how often. HOT FM91.3 also introduced 'HOTFM CONTROL' in which fans are given access to an entire database of songs that the station plays. Fans will be able to determine the next track that they want to hear in real-time with their votes and the winning song will be played on air immediately. 
With the introduction of HOTFM CONTROL, a fan's preference makes up the music selection of the station's weekly playlist. 
The station is also focused on engagement with its listeners through on-ground events such as its signature "Must Drink Friday" held on the last Friday of the month with free flow of drinks and interaction with their favourite DJs. Hot FM also engages its listeners on the street with car decal giveaways and live broadcasts, in school with Recess Express school visits, online with Facebook and the station website, and on Mobile with Hot FM's iPhone & Android apps.

The HOT FM91.3 line-up includes The Shan & Cheryl Show in the mornings from 6am to 10pm. JJ plays non-stop hits from 10am to 4pm followed by BT, Adam and Josh taking you home from 4pm to 7;30pm. Charmaine Yee of the HOT 30 Countdown rounds up the day with the daily fan rated chart show.

Hot FM is now known as ONE FM, and targets a male audience demographic.

In September 2012, Singapore welcomed KISS 92 FM, raising the number of radio stations from 18 to 19 on the island. Following a tender for bids on two open dial positions, the media company SPH UnionWorks Pte Ltd was successful in procuring the one opening that was ultimately allotted at 92.0 MHz with a proposal to have the station target mainly women listeners, but also included in the anticipated target audience – families. It provides in-depth women and family content, coupled with adult contemporary music. Women aged 30 and above, and families will find the channel informative and entertaining.

Kiss92 brings on experts to share their knowledge on topics such as Relationships and Family Matters, Health and Wellness issues, Financial Planning and Career Advancements. It also covers Fashion and Beauty, Shopping, Entertainment, as well as offer listings of family friendly and community events. Tapping on its collaboration with SPH Magazines,

Maddy, Jason and Arnold in the morning start the day from 6am to 10pm followed by Claressa Monteiro jazzing up the afternoon from 10am to 2pm. Desiree Lai from 2pm to 4pm and John Klass taking fans home helming the 4pm to 8pm show.

UFM100.3 is a highly charged Mandarin infotainment station targeting working professionals aged between 35 – 49 years that is specially catered to their lifestyle. Its creative, lively and engaging delivery style is able to consistently hook listeners on for a far longer period of listening. Program content is designed to cater specifically for the busy individuals with timely updates and discussions on current affairs, health and wellness, financial planning, property investment, communication, lifestyle, music and entertainment.

The station's drive-time programmes are anchored by veteran DJs Wenhong, Limei and Xiaozhu in the morning, and DJ Anna in the evening. Lunch time programme is helmed by Yuling from 10am to 2pm followed by Liangquan from 2pm to 5pm.

The station actively engages its listeners through various interactive events such as dinner gatherings and enrichment workshops. To further strengthen loyalty, DJs also reaches out to the public through its outdoor activations, conducting games and giveaway prizes while introducing the station to new potential listeners. UFM100.3 also supports various community, non-profit and charity organizations with its annual U-Shine program that raises public awareness of lesser-known causes and charities.

MONEY FM 89.3 and 96.3 Hao FM are set up in January 2018, and they are the latest addition to SPH Media Trust's radio brand. MONEY FM 89.3 targets educated English speakers aged 35 years and above who take an interest in everyday personal finance matters, while 96.3 Hao FM targets bilingual Singaporeans aged 45 years and above with Chinese music and infotainment.

Listenership 
All most-listenership.

Nielsen Radio Diary Survey 2021 Wave 2 - RadioInfo Asia
Nielsen Radio Diary Survey 2020 Wave 2 - Mediacorp
Nielsen Radio Diary Survey 2019 Wave 2 - AsiaRadioToday
Nielsen Radio Diary Survey 2019 Wave 1 (Mediacorp) - CNA
Nielsen Radio Diary Survey 2018 Wave 2 (Mediacorp) - AsiaRadioToday
Nielsen Radio Diary Survey 2018 Wave 2 (SPH) - AsiaRadioToday
Nielsen Radio Diary Survey 2017 Wave 2 (Mediacorp) - AsiaRadioToday
Nielsen Radio Diary Survey 2017 Wave 2 (SPH) - AsiaRadioToday
Nielsen Radio Diary Survey 2017 Wave 1 (SPH) - SPH
Nielsen Radio Diary Survey 2016 Wave 2 (Mediacorp) - AsiaRadioToday
Nielsen Radio Diary Survey 2016 Wave 2 (SPH) - AsiaRadioToday
Nielsen Radio Diary Survey 2015 Wave 2 (SPH) - AsiaRadioToday
Nielsen Radio Diary Survey 2015 Wave 1 (Mediacorp) - AsiaRadioToday

Radio stations

FM stations 

 Perfect 10 (now known as 987) was officially launched as very first 24-hour radio station in Singapore on New Year's Day 1989 at midnight stroke SST. All radio stations started broadcasting 24/7 from New Year's Day 2008.
 Mediacorp used to offer Visual Radio service on Nokia phones. The first radio stations to utilise Visual Radio are 987 in December 2005 and YES 933 in June 2006. The service has since been discontinued.
 The 89.3 MHz frequency on the FM band used to be occupied by TVMobile. An audio simulcast of the TV channel was available until the station closed down on 31 December 2009. It has since been occupied by Money FM 89.3 since 29 January 2018.
 The 99.5 MHz frequency on the FM band used to be occupied by Passion 99.5FM, a station set up by the National Arts Council in December 1997 that supported and played local music. The station closed down on 31 December 2003 due to the bad economic climate as there was insufficient sponsorship and advertising revenue to cover operating costs. The frequency was then awarded to Mediacorp in May 2004 and the new station, Lush 99.5FM, was launched 9 months later. The station ceased operations on 1 September 2017 as part of a rationalization of Mediacorp's network of radio stations.
 The 96.3 MHz frequency on the FM band used to be occupied by Expat Radio XFM 96.3 by Mediacorp. Formerly known as FM 96.3 - The International Channel, which was launched on 12 October 1998, the new name reinforces the station's role in providing a variety of content for the expatriate communities in Singapore, while redefining the experience of feeling closer to home. The station ceased operations on 30 September 2016. It has since been occupied by 96.3 Hao FM since 8 January 2018. Meanwhile, the Bollywood belt Radio Masti continued as the first independent LIVE digital radio as RADIO MASTI 24x7 and can be tuned in from anywhere anytime across the globe by downloading the APP Radio Masti 24x7.
 The former Jurong Drive-in Cinema used to rely on their own radio station to transmit audio from their movies through their own radio station. Car drivers would tune in to the radio station to listen to the sound from the movies.

DAB stations 
Mediacorp used to operate "Digital Radio", a radio service using digital audio broadcasting technology which simulcast eight FM stations, namely Class 95FM, Gold 905FM, 987FM, YES 933, Love 97.2FM, Symphony 92.4FM, and 938LIVE and broadcast six digital-only stations, namely Cruise, Club Play, JK-Pop, Chinese Evergreens, Planet Bollywood and Bloomberg.

The service was discontinued on 1 December 2011 as the low adoption of DAB radio (compared to FM radio) and the prevalence of listening to Internet radio streams on computers and mobile devices has rendered DAB radio irrelevant.

Shortwave stations 
Launched in 1994, Radio Singapore International (RSI) operated as the external service for Singapore. The station launched a signature program in 1996 called 'Friends of the Airwaves' reaching out throughout South-East Asia. The station featured programs in several languages, and was chiefly run by MediaCorp Radio.  RSI ceased operation on 31 July 2008.

Internet Only Stations 
Launched on 15 September 2020, VintageRadio.SG is a station for Seniors in Singapore to call their own. Day-parted by the four National languages and hosted by Brian Richmond (English), Patrick 郭贤华 (Chinese with Hokkien and Cantonese dialects), PN Bala (Tamil) and Rahimah Rahim (Malay), the station aims to provide Seniors with the impetus to bridge the digital divide and help improve the mental well-being of Seniors in Singapore through nostalgia. Other Senior relevant content is also produced and aggregated for the benefit of Seniors from information on Vascular Dementia prevention to Healthy Aging through continuous learning. VintageRadioSG also aims to bring about more awareness of the rising Silver Tide that Singapore is experiencing. VintageRadioSG is a registered CLG. As a not-for-profit SE, the channel does not receive any PSB funding and is dependent on commercials, sponsorship and donations to keep the lights on.

In September 2021, IndieGo, the spiritual successor to Lush 99.5FM which closed in 2017, was launched. Similar to its predecessor, IndieGo's music format focuses on local and alternative music. The station also features dayparts of various genres, such as soul/R&B, acoustic/folk, indie pop/electronica, rock, hip-hop.

See also
 Television in Singapore
 List of television stations in Southeast Asia
 Censorship in Singapore
 Communications in Singapore
 Media of Singapore

Defunct companies
 SPH MediaWorks
 NTUC Media

Existing companies
 Mediacorp
 SPH Media Trust
 StarHub TV
 Singtel TV
 Rediffusion

References

External links
MediaCorp Singapore
StarHub CableTV
Rediffusion Singapore
Media Development Authority
The History of 40 years of Television in Singapore
SPH corporate announcement of merger with MediaCorp
SPH press release: "Channel i to close on 1 January 2005, Channel U and Channel 8 to have complementary programming"
Singapore television discussion forum
 Remembering Rediffusion Singapore

1925 establishments in Singapore